MCHotDog (born April 10, 1978) is a Taiwanese rap artist known for his use of explicit lyrics in his songs.

In 2001, his four mini-CDs sold over 220,000 copies. In 2004, he toured with Chang Chen-yue in the North American Kill Kitty tour. In 2006, MCHotDog released an album Wake Up, which contains hit song 「我愛臺妹」 (I Love Taiwanese Girls).  「我愛臺妹」 is currently featured in a commercial for Kuang Chuan Tea Time. It sampled Glenn Frey's "The One You Love" and The Spinners (American R&B group)'s "I'll Be Around". The track won "Best Karaoke Song" at the 2007 HITO Radio Music Awards, presented by Taiwanese radio station Hit FM. Wake Up was both a critically acclaimed album as well as a commercial success, as it provided MCHotDog with crossover appeal. In 2008, MCHotDog released a new album called Mr. Almost.

He has been a judge on The Rap of China television show.

Career 
MC HotDog's career began when he was a student at Fu Jen Catholic University, which he attended from 1996 to 2001. During this period, he self-published his music through the website "Master U". These songs attracted significant attention from the Mandarin-speaking hip-hop community, leading HotDog to be regarded as Taiwan's first underground rap artist. After performing at a 1999 concert, HotDog was introduced by the venue owner to figures from the Magic Stone Music label. He subsequently signed with Big Circus Music Studio, a subsidiary of Magic Stone that also represented artists like Dwagie, in 2000. Through Big Circus, HotDog released a sequence of four EPs throughout 2001, which collectively sold over 300,000 copies.

In 2002 and 2003, MC HotDog was unable to release any music, as he was performing his mandatory military service. However, after his discharge from the military, he rapidly began touring. In 2004 and 2005, HotDog supported Chang Chen-yue in tours throughout Taiwan, the United States, and Hong Kong. He also performed at the 17th Golden Melody Awards in 2006.

MC HotDog released his first studio album, Wake Up, in January 2006. This album proved to be a critical success, winning Best Mandarin Album at the 18th Golden Melody Awards. HotDog also followed the album's release with an April 2006 solo concert at Taipei World Trade Center II. MC HotDog followed Wake Up with the 2008 album Mr. Almost and the 2012 album Poverty Million Star.

In 2017, MC HotDog joined the cast of reality competition show The Rap of China as a judge. He continued to serve in this role for the show's second and third seasons. HotDog also appeared as a contestant on the reality show Call Me by Fire in 2021.

MC HotDog served as an instructor for "Rap for Youth" in 2020.

Personal life
In a 2014 interview, MC HotDog stated that during his youth he had taken drugs such as MDMA, marijuana, and ketamine, but that he had since quit for the sake of his health.

Musical work

Extended play

Regular album

"Brothers True Colors Sunset" (G.U.T.S.)

Extended play

Single

Host works 
Music Television Taiwan Channel（MTV.tw）'What can you expect from a dog but a bark'（狗嘴不吐象牙）Hot Dog Show，Cooperate with Dwagie. -During the show: September 11, 2007

IQIYI 'The Rap of China' One of the instructors, commented with Chang Chen-yue.

IQIYI 'The Rap of China2' One of the instructors, Partner with Z Chang Chen-yue again.

YouTube, ETtoday News Cloud, Chung T'ien Television(CTi TV), Taiwan Television Enterprise(TTV), IQIYI 'Dancing Diamond 52'Special tutor

bilibili 'Rap for Youth' one of the mentors.

Other work

Film and television works 
movie：A Strong Insect Crossing The River（猛虫过江）as Zaihu（在虎）

Web drama：SOHU 'Need for Lady 4'（极品女士4）

Ad：Galactic online（银河线上）'I have money Online'，Xiaoyaohuyu(逍遥互娱) 'Inuyasha Jade Hunting Journey'（犬夜叉 寻玉之旅）

concert

Award record

References

External links
Kill Kitty Tour 2004 site
 (traditional Chinese)Official website

1978 births
Living people
Taiwanese male singers
Taiwanese rappers
Fu Jen Catholic University alumni
Musicians from Taipei